Michael Berrer, the defending champion, did not participate.
No. 8 seed Conor Niland defeated unseeded Jerzy Janowicz 7–6(7–5), 6–7(2–7), 6–3 in the final.

Seeds

Draw

Finals

Top half

Bottom half

References
 Main Draw
 Qualifying Draw

ATP Salzburg Indoors - Singles
ATP Salzburg Indoors